The 1991–92 rugby union Scottish Inter-District Championship was a curtailed rugby union championship.

Unusually, six teams competed in this year's tournament. Glasgow District, Edinburgh District, South, North and Midlands and the Anglo Scots were joined by a SRU Presidents XV side.

Each team played only two matches. No winner was declared.

1991-92 League Table

The league table is shown for completeness.

Results

Round 1

South: 

Glasgow District:

Edinburgh District: 

Anglo-Scots:

North and Midlands: 

Presidents XV:

Round 2

Presidents XV: 

Anglo-Scots:

North and Midlands: 

Glasgow District:

South: 

Edinburgh District:

Matches outwith the Championship

Trial matches

Blues: 

Reds:

References

1991–92 in Scottish rugby union
1991–92
Scot